Paris District High School (PDHS) is a regional high school in Paris, Ontario, Canada.  The school was built in 1923, replacing the previous grammar school which had been built in 1858, and was known officially as Paris High School until a large addition was constructed in the late 1960s.

In 2004, PDHS served students from Paris and other towns found in the immediate area, including St. George, Drumbo, Burford, Princeton and Glen Morris.

See also
List of high schools in Ontario

References

External links 
 

High schools in Ontario
Educational institutions established in 1923
1923 establishments in Ontario